Macroramphosidae, the snipefishes and bellowsfishes is a family of oviparous, marine fish which form part of the superfamily Centriscoidea, which is one of the two superfamilies in the suborder Aulostomoidei of the order Syngnathiformes, which includes the seahorses, pipefishes, trumpetfishes and dragonets. It has been considered to be a subfamily of the Centriscidae but Nelson (2016) classified it as a family.

Genera
There are currently three recognised extant genera which are placed in the Macroramphosidae:

 Centriscops Gill, 1862
 Macroramphosus Lacepède, 1803
 Notopogon Regan, 1914

Fossil record

The earliest known syngnathiform is a species of Macroramphosidae, Gasteroramphosus zuppichini from the late Cretaceous, which is similar in form to Marcroramphosus but which has some characters which are suggestive of a relation to Gasterosteoidei.

References

Syngnathiformes